John Mandeville was the putative author of the 14th-century travel book, The Travels of Sir John Mandeville.

John Mandeville may also refer to:
 John Mandeville (priest) (1655–1725), Church of England prelate
 John Mandeville (Land Leaguer)  (1849–1888), Irish agrarian agitator